Golden is a village in Adams County, Illinois, United States. The population was 648 at the 2010 census. It is part of the Quincy, IL–MO Micropolitan Statistical Area.

Geography
Golden is located at  (40.109772, -91.018548).

History
Golden was laid out and platted in 1866 under the name of Keokuk Junction. The village was incorporated on March 5, 1867; the first election was held April 1 of the same year. The village was renamed Golden in 1881, likely due to the presence of a local hotel called the Hotel Golden.

Demographics

As of the 2020 census there were 648 people, 297 households, and 180 families residing in the village. The racial makeup of the village was 93.83% White, 0.31% Native American, 1.23% Asian, 0.46% from other races, and 4.17% from two or more races. Hispanic or Latino of any race were 1.70% of the population.

There were 297 households, out of which 47.14% had children under the age of 18 living with them, 48.15% were married couples living together, 11.11% had a female householder with no husband present, and 39.39% were non-families. 37.71% of all households were made up of individuals, and 21.89% had someone living alone who was 65 years of age or older. The average household size was 2.82 and the average family size was 2.18.

The village's age distribution consisted of 23.4% under the age of 18, 3.5% from 18 to 24, 20.9% from 25 to 44, 25.4% from 45 to 64, and 26.9% who were 65 years of age or older. The median age was 46.8 years. For every 100 females, there were 101.5 males. For every 100 females age 18 and over, there were 82.1 males.

The median income for a household in the village was $51,979, and the median income for a family was $77,857. Males had a median income of $42,054 versus $29,091 for females. The per capita income for the village was $26,132. About 6.7% of families and 14.1% of the population were below the poverty line, including 9.3% of those under age 18 and 32.4% of those age 65 or over.

Points of interest
The Windmills of Golden

Registered Historic Places
Ebenezer Methodist Episcopal Chapel and Cemetery
Exchange Bank

References

External links
Early history of Golden
The Prairie Mills Windmill, Golden Historical Society

Villages in Adams County, Illinois
1862 establishments in Illinois